Edward Norris,  (bapt. 19 April 1665 – 22 July 1726) was an English physician and parliamentarian. He was the secretary of an embassy from the East India Company to the Mogul Empire in 1701, and an MP for Liverpool from 1715 to 1722. The family name is sometimes spelt Norres or Norreys.

Life

Origins 
Edward Norris was descended from a distinguished family, who had represented Liverpool in Parliament almost continuously since the Revolution. Some sources say he was born in 1663, though he was baptised at Childwall, Lancashire on 19 April 1665. He was the fifth son of Thomas Norris (–1686) of Speke, Lancashire, and his wife, Katherine (born 1632), daughter of Sir Henry Garway (Garraway). He was the younger brother of Thomas Norris and Sir William Norris.

Edward graduated BA from Brasenose College, Oxford, in 1686, and proceeded MA in 1689, MB in 1691, and MD in 1695. He practised medicine at Chester, and his scientific reputation is attested by the fact that as early as 1698 he was a Fellow of the Royal Society.

India 
In 1699 he was chosen by the new East India Company to accompany his brother, Sir William Norris, as secretary of his embassy to the Mogul Emperor. He visited the camp of Aurangazíb in the Deccan from April to November 1701. On 28 April 1701, he entered the Mogul's camp at Parnella 'in a rich palanquin, bearing his Majesty's letters to the Emperor'. He sailed for England in September 1702, bringing with him a cargo valued at 147,000 rupees, 60,000 rupees of which belonged to the Company and 87,000 to his brother.

Later life 
After an interval of mental or physical illness caused by the hardships of the journey, Norris resumed the profession of medicine at Utkinton, Cheshire, and was elected a Fellow of the Royal College of Physicians in 1716. He was returned unopposed as a Whig for Liverpool in 1715, and voted with the Government on the Septennial Bill, but against them on the repeal of the Occasional Conformity and Schism Acts and the Peerage Bill. He did not stand in 1722.

He died on 22 July 1726, and was buried at St. Michael's Chapel, attached to Garston Hall, a manor of the Norris family, near Speke. He is there commemorated:

Marriage and issue 
In 1705 he married Ann (1675/6–1729), daughter of William Cleveland of Liverpool, by whom he left one son, with whose death, some time before 1736, the family of the Norrises of Speke in the male line became extinct.

Achievement 
 Arms: as before.—Quarterly, argent and gules; a fesse, azure. In the second and third quarters, a fret, or.
 Crest: as allowed in 1664, on a wreath a mount vert, an erne or eagle, wings elevated, proper.

See also 

 Speke Hall

Notes

References 
 Cruickshanks, Eveline (1970). "Norris, Edward (1663–1726), of Utkinton, Cheshire". In Sedgwick, R. (ed.). The History of Parliament: the House of Commons 1715–1754. Vol. 2. London: Her Majesty's Stationery Office, Boydell & Brewer. The History of Parliament Trust 1964–2020.
 Farrer, William and Brownbill, J., eds. (1907). "Townships: Speke". In A History of the County of Lancaster. Vol. 3. London: Victoria County History. pp. 131–140. BHO: British History Online.
  
 Lane-Poole, Stanley and Bevan, Michael (2004). "Norris, Edward (bap. 1665, d. 1726), physician". In Oxford Dictionary of National Biography. Oxford University Press.
 Munk, William (1878). The Roll of the Royal College of Physicians of London. 2nd ed. Vol. 2: 1701 to 1800. London: The College, Pall Mall East. p. 39.
 Proceedings and Papers of the Historic Society of Lancashire and Cheshire. Session I: 1848–49. Liverpool, 1849. pp. 148, 170.

External links 

 "Baptisms at All Saints in the District of Childwall, Liverpool". Lancashire OnLine Parish Clerks. 2006. Retrieved 3 May 2022.
 "Edward Norris (b.? d.1726)". RCP Museum. Royal College of Physicians. 2019. Retrieved 3 May 2022.
 "Speke Hall's colonial connections". National Trust. 15 September 2014. Retrieved 3 May 2022.

1660s births
1726 deaths
Fellows of the Royal Society
Fellows of the Royal College of Physicians
18th-century English medical doctors
Members of the Parliament of Great Britain for Liverpool